Hans Mikkelsen (24 March 1914 – 25 February 2004) was a Danish rower. He competed in the men's coxed four at the 1936 Summer Olympics.

References

1914 births
2004 deaths
Danish male rowers
Olympic rowers of Denmark
Rowers at the 1936 Summer Olympics
Rowers from Copenhagen